Wayne Davies may refer to:

Wayne Davies (football manager), for Port Talbot Town F.C.
Wayne Davies (real tennis), see Grand Slam (real tennis)

See also
Wayne Davis (disambiguation)